Eric Jay Bloom (born December 1, 1944) is an American musician, singer and songwriter. He is best known as the co-lead vocalist, guitar and keyboard/synthesizer player for the long-running band Blue Öyster Cult, with work on more than 20 albums. Much of his lyrical content relates to his lifelong interest in science fiction.

Early life and education
A native New Yorker, Bloom was born in Brooklyn, the youngest of three children, and grew up in Queens. His mother was a housewife, active in local charities and family life. His father ran a picture frame and print company in Manhattan. Bloom is Jewish. Bloom attended JHS 216 (George J. Ryan Junior High School), and then moved on to Woodmere Academy and Cheshire Academy in Connecticut. It was there that he purchased his first guitar, a $52 Harmony full-bodied electric.

After graduating from Cheshire Academy in 1962, he went to Spain for the summer, studying at Menendez Pelayo University in Santander, before starting college in the fall.

Bloom, known as "Manny" Bloom in college, attended Hobart College in Geneva, New York, studying modern languages. In 1964, he left early to work for a family car-importing company, but he returned a year later, partially out of concerns that if he was not in school, he would be picked up in the Vietnam draft.  
In college, Bloom was involved with the casual forming of a couple of short-term bands for playing at local venues. One of these was Rick and the Ravons (Bloom being Rick). He also organized music for various fraternity parties. For one of them, he hired a band that later asked him to join. They renamed it as Lost and Found, with whom he performed off and on for a few years. The band was composed of George Faust on guitar, John Trivers on bass, Peter Haviland on lead guitar, Jeff Hayes as drummer, and Bloom singing.

In 1963, Bloom was also exposed to the music of Wilmer and the Dukes, who made a profound impression on him. He attended over 100 of their performances, and he and his band Lost and Found opened for them when they came to play at Hobart. Other major influences were James Brown, and Ronnie James Dio.

In Bloom's senior year, he was encouraged by his friends to join their Tau Kappa Epsilon fraternity. He also found himself volunteering to do sound engineering at local college events (such as a performance by Iron Butterfly), simply because he could not stand how bad the sound was. It was through his efforts that the college finally updated to a better sound system, after he graduated in 1967 (receiving a BA in modern languages).

Career

Summer of Love: 1967 
After college, Bloom toured with the band in upstate New York (he was the only one who had a van to transport equipment). The band had some membership changes and was renamed as Rock Garden. They made one attempt to record a single but could not land a contract, so they continued on with live performances and cover tunes, until the band broke up in July 1967.

Though Bloom had applied and been accepted for graduate school at San Diego State University, he decided instead to spend the Summer of Love of 1967 as a drifter, pan-handling or selling sketches for $1 in Provincetown (P-town), Cape Cod, until he got a job washing dishes. On Labor Day, his college friend Trivers invited him to perform in Clayton, New York the next night. Despite the short notice, Bloom packed up and left Provincetown for good. Lost and Found re-formed and played through the rest of the season.

Soft White Underbelly: 1968–1971 
In 1968, Bloom moved to Plainview, Long Island to live with his sister. He obtained a job at Sam Ash Music in Hempstead, selling music equipment. One day in late 1968 some members of the band Soft White Underbelly, Donald Roeser (later Buck Dharma), Allen Lanier and Andrew Winters, entered the store. One of them spotted a photo that Bloom had put up as a joke—he had placed an 8x10 glossy of his old band Lost and Found up on the wall with all the major bands such as the Rolling Stones and The Who. One of the SWU members recognized it because Les Braunstein, their lead singer, had also been a Hobart College alumnus, and had told his bandmates about the other college band. As Bloom talked with them about the photo, they struck up a friendship. Bloom ended up doing some sound engineering for them at the Electric Circus in Greenwich Village, and they mutually impressed each other enough that in November 1968, the band's manager, Sandy Pearlman, asked if Bloom would like to become their tour manager. Bloom moved into the group's house in Great Neck, New York in December 1968.

Blue Öyster Cult: 1972–present 

In April 1969, when lead singer Braunstein dropped out of the group, Bloom became the band's vocalist. The band went through several name changes, but in 1971 settled on Blue Öyster Cult. Their first album was released by Columbia Records in 1972, and they were voted "Best New Band" by Creem magazine.

In 1976, their platinum album Agents of Fortune with its hit "(Don't Fear) the Reaper" launched the band into international fame, though that particular song was sung and written by lead guitarist Buck Dharma. Both Creem readers and Rolling Stone critics voted "Don't Fear the Reaper" as the top single of the year.

Bloom bought his own house in Great Neck in 1976, where he still resides to this day.

Bloom has been one of the longtime members of the band throughout the decades, along with original member Buck Dharma (it is estimated that they have given over 4,000 live performances). He has co-written many of the band's songs, and often collaborates with writers both inside and outside the music industry. Bloom is credited as playing "stun guitar" on some Blue Öyster Cult works, a term the band uses for the distortion sound of his rhythm guitar.

Outside work
Bloom is known for being an avid reader, especially science fiction and fantasy novels. He once sent a fan letter to English science-fiction author Michael Moorcock, and then collaborated with him on three songs. "Black Blade" was written from the point of view of Moorcock's Elric character, and the other two were "The Great Sun Jester" and "Veteran of the Psychic Wars", the latter of which was used in the original Heavy Metal movie. In 1987, Bloom and Moorcock performed the song live at the Dragon*Con convention in Atlanta, Georgia.

Bloom also collaborated with author Eric Van Lustbader on the song "Shadow Warrior", and in 1998, 2001 and 2020 with cyberpunk author John Shirley on the Heaven Forbid', Curse of the Hidden Mirror and The Symbol Remains'' albums.

In 2006, Bloom began a partnership with artist Philippe Renaudin, to create and sell six elaborately painted custom-made guitars, each one of which interprets a different Blue Öyster Cult song, and each of which was played during BÖC performances.

References

External links 
Official website
Eric Bloom Guitars – Bloom's 2006 series of custom guitars
1996 interview
Classic Rock Visited – Bloom interview

1944 births
Living people
American rock guitarists
American male guitarists
American heavy metal singers
Jewish American musicians
Jewish singers
Jewish rock musicians
Jewish heavy metal musicians
Blue Öyster Cult members
Songwriters from New York (state)
Musicians from Brooklyn
People from Queens, New York
Hobart and William Smith Colleges alumni
People from Plainview, New York
Guitarists from New York (state)
Lawrence Woodmere Academy alumni
20th-century American guitarists
Cheshire Academy alumni
Psychedelic rock musicians